The Crossword Book Award (formerly known as the Crossword Book Award (1998–2003), the Hutch Crossword Book Award (2004–07), the Vodafone Crossword Book Award (2008–10), the Economist Crossword Book Award (2011–13), Raymond & Crossword Book Award (2014–present)) is an Indian book award hosted by Crossword Bookstores and their sponsors. The Award was instituted in 1998 by Indian book retailer Crossword with the intention of competing with The Booker Prize, Commonwealth Writers' Prize or The Pulitzer Prize.

History and administration
According to the website of the Crossword Bookstore,

"While several Indian writers have won awards abroad, we had observed that there was no equivalent award in India. We therefore decided to take on the role of encouraging and promoting good Indian writing and instituted the Book Awards, in 1998. It is the only Indian award that not only recognizes and rewards good writing but also actively promotes the authors and their books."

Nominations are on the basis of sales as tracked by Crossword, and the eventual winners are chosen based on a public poll that's partly online and partly real world (voting at Crossword outlets).

The award was initially for a single work of fiction by an Indian citizen. In 2000, an additional prize was offered for an Indian writing in any Indian language translated into English. There was no award between 2001–03. Starting in 2004 the award was sponsored by Hutch Essar an Indian telecommunications company and called the Hutch Crossword Book Award.

Starting in 2006 additional categories of a nonfiction prize and a popular award, voted on by the public, were added. Starting in 2008, Hutch Essar was purchased by English telecommunications company Vodafone Group and the award was called Vodafone Crossword Book Award.

Beginning in 2011 through 2013, it was sponsored by The Economist in association with Principal Mutual Funds and Standard Chartered, and renamed the Economist Crossword Book Award. Beginning in 2014, it was sponsored by the Raymond Group.

Winners
Previous winners.
{| class="wikitable sortable"
!Year
!Category
!Author
!Title
!Refs
|-
|1998
|English Fiction
|I. Allan Sealy
|The Everest Hotel
|
|-
| rowspan="2" |1999
|English Fiction
|Vikram Seth
|An Equal Music
|
|-
|Indian Language Fiction Translation
|M. Mukundan
|On the Banks of the Mayyazhi
|
|-
| rowspan="2" |2000
|English Fiction
|Jamyang Norbu
|The Mandala of Sherlock Holmes
|
|-
|Indian Language Fiction Translation
|Bama / Translator: Lakshmi Holmström
|Karukku
|
|-
| rowspan="2" |2004
|English Fiction
|Amitav Ghosh
|The Hungry Tide
|
|-
|Indian Language Fiction Translation
|Chandrasekhar Rath / Translator: Jatindra Kumar Nayak
|Astride the Wheel (Yantrarudha)
|
|-
| rowspan="4" |2005
|English Fiction
|Salman Rushdie
|Shalimar the Clown
|
|-
|English Non Fiction
|Suketu Mehta
|Maximum City: Bombay Lost & Found
|
|-
|Indian Language Fiction Translation
|Krishna Sobti
|The Heart Has Its Reasons
|
|-
|Popular Award
|Rahul Bhattacharya
|Pundits From Pakistan
|
|-
| rowspan="5" |2006
|English Fiction
|Vikram Chandra
|Sacred Games
|
|-
|English Non Fiction
|Vikram Seth
|Two Lives
|
|-
| rowspan="2" |Indian Language Fiction Translation
|Ambai (C. S. Lakshmi) / Translator: Lakshmi Holmström
|In a Forest, a Deer
|
|-
|M. Mukundan / Translator: Gita Krishnankutty
|Kesavan's Lamentations
|
|-
|Popular Award
|Kiran Desai
|The Inheritance of Loss
|
|-
| rowspan="5" |2007
|English Fiction
|Usha K. R.
|A Girl and a River
|
|-
|English Non Fiction
|William Dalrymple
|The Last Mughal
|
|-
| rowspan="2" |Indian Language Fiction Translation
|Sankar / Translator: Arunava Sinha
|Chowringhee
|
|-
|Anand  / Translated from Malayalam by Gita Krishnankutty
|Govardhan's Travels
|
|-
|Popular Award
|Namita Devidayal
|The Music Room
|
|-
| rowspan="5" |2008
| rowspan="2" |English Fiction
|Amitav Ghosh
|Sea of Poppies
|
|-
|Neel Mukherjee
|Past Continuous
|
|-
|English Non Fiction
|Basharat Peer
|Curfewed Night
|
|-
|Indian Language Fiction Translation
|Manohar Shyam Joshi / Translator: Ira Pande
|T’TA Professor
|
|-
|Popular Award
|Pallavi Aiyar
|Smoke & Mirrors
|
|-
| rowspan="6" |2009
|English Fiction
|Kalpana Swaminathan
|Venus Crossing: Twelve Stories of Transit
|
|-
| rowspan="2" |English Non Fiction
|Rajni Bakshi
|Bazaars, Conversations and Freedom
|
|-
|Sunanda K. Datta-Ray
|Looking East to Look West: Lee Kuan Yew's Mission India
|
|-
|Indian Language Fiction Translation
|Sarah Joseph / Translator: Valson Thampu
|Othappu: The Scent of the Other Side
|
|-
|Popular Award
|Rajni Bakshi
|Bazaars, Conversations and Freedom
|
|-
|Children's Literature
|Siddhartha Sarma
|The Grasshopper's Run
|
|-
| rowspan="6" |2010
| rowspan="2" |English Fiction
|Omair Ahmad
|Jimmy the Terrorist
|
|-
|Anjali Joseph
|Saraswati Park
|
|-
|English Non Fiction
|VS Ramachandran
|The Tell-Tale Brain
|
|-
|Indian Language Fiction Translation
|NS Madhavan / Translator: Rajesh Rajamohan
|Litanies of Dutch Battery
|
|-
|Popular Award
|Ashwin Sanghi
|Chanakya's Chant
|
|-
|Children's Literature
|Ranjit Lal
|Faces in the Water
|
|-
| rowspan="6" |2011
| rowspan="2" |English Non Fiction
|Anuradha Roy
|The Folded Earth
|
|-
|Aman Sethi
|A Free Man
|
|-
| rowspan="2" |Indian Language Fiction Translation
|Anita Agnihotri / Translated from Bengali by Arunava Sinha
|17
|
|-
|Narayan / Translated from Malayalam by Catherine Thankamma
|The Araya Women
|
|-
|Popular Award
|Ravi Subramanian
|The Incredible Banker
|
|-
|Children's Literature
| colspan="2" |No Award
|
|-
| rowspan="8" |2013
| rowspan="2" |English Fiction
|Jerry Pinto
|Em and the Big Hoom
|
|-
|Janice Pariat
|Boats on Land
|
|-
| rowspan="2" |English Non Fiction
|Ananya Vajpeyi
|Righteous Republic
|
|-
|Pankaj Mishra
|From The Ruins Of Empire
|
|-
|Indian Language Fiction Translation
|Ismat Chugtai / Translated by M Asaduddin
|A Life In Words
|
|-
|Popular Award
|Ravi Subramanian
|The Bankster
|
|-
| rowspan="2" |Children's Literature
|Payal Kapadia
|Wisha Wozzariter
|
|-
|Uma Krishnaswami
|Book Uncle and Me
|
|-
| rowspan="5" |2015
|English Fiction
|Anees Salim
|The Blind Lady’s Descendants
|
|-
|English Non Fiction
|Samanth Subramanian
|This Divided Island: Stories from the Sri Lankan War
|
|-
|Indian Language Fiction Translation
|Sundara Ramaswamy / Translated from Tamil by Lakshmi Holmstrom
|Children, Women, Men
|
|-
|Popular Award
|Ravi Subramanian
|Bankerupt
|
|-
|Kotak Junior Children's Literature
|Shals Mahajan
|Timmi in Tangles
|
|-
| rowspan="5" |2016
|English Fiction
|Amitav Ghosh
|Flood of Fire
|
|-
|English Non Fiction
|Akshaya Mukul
|Gita Press and the Making of Hindu India
|
|-
|Indian Language Fiction Translation
|Shamsur Rahman Faruqi
|The Sun That Rose From the Earth
|
|-
|Popular Award
|Amish Tripathi
|Scion of Ikshvaku
|
|-
|Kotak Junior Children's Literature
|Ranjit Lal
|Nana was a Nutcase
|
|-
| rowspan="10" |2017
|Indian Fiction: Jury
|Sujit Saraf
|Harilal and Sons
|
|-
|Indian Non Fiction: Jury
|Josy Joseph
|A Feast of Vultures: The Hidden Business of Democracy in India
|
|-
|Indian Language Fiction Translation
|Subhash Chandran / Translated from Malayalam by Fathima EV
|A Preface to Man
|
|-
|Children's Literature: Jury
|Anita Nair
|Muezza and Baby Jaan
|
|-
|Indian Fiction: Popular
|Durjoy Datta
|Our Impossible Love
|
|-
|Indian Non Fiction: Popular
|Sadhguru
|Inner Engineering: A Yogi's Guide to Joy
|
|-
|Children's Literature: Popular
|Archita Mishra
|The Storm Bringer
|
|-
|Business & Management: Popular
|Shantanu Guha Ray
|The Target
|
|-
|Biography: Popular
|Karan Johar and Poonam Saxena
|An Unsuitable Boy
|
|-
|Health & Fitness
|Isha Foundation
|A Taste of Well-Being
|
|-
| rowspan="11" |2018
|Indian Fiction: Jury
|Prayaag Akbar
|Leila
|
|-
|Indian Non Fiction: Jury
|Snigdha Poonam
|Dreamers: How Young Indians Are Changing The World
|
|-
|Indian Language Fiction Translation
|Benyamin / Translated from Malayalam by Shahnaz Habib
|Jasmine Days
|
|-
|Children's Literature: Jury
|Nandhika Nambi
|Unbroken
|
|-
|Indian Fiction: Popular
|Durjoy Datta
|The Boy Who Loved
|
|-
|Indian Non Fiction: Popular
|Sudha Murthy
|Three Thousand Stitches
|
|-
|Children's Literature: Popular
|Ruskin Bond
|Looking For The Rainbow
|
|-
|Business & Management: Popular
|Chandramouli Venkatesan
|Catalyst
|
|-
|Biography: Popular
|Soha Ali Khan
|The Perils of Being Moderately Famous
|
|-
|Health & Fitness
|Sanjeev Kapoor, Dr. Sarita Daware
|You’ve Lost Weight : The Easy Guide To Receiving This Compliment Every Day
|
|-
|Lifetime Achievement Award
|Shashi Tharoor
|
|
|}

References

External links
Crossword Book Award
Crossword Bookstores
Crossword Bookstores on Facebook

Indian literary awards
Awards established in 1998
Translation awards
1998 establishments in India